Ashley John Brehaut (born 18 September 1980) is a now retired male badminton player from Australia and current primary school physical education teacher.

Brehaut competed in badminton at the 2004 Summer Olympics in men's doubles with partner Travis Denney.  They were defeated in the round of 32 by Pramote Teerawiwatana and Tesana Panvisvas of Thailand. In 2006, he and Denney won the bronze medal at the Oceania Championships, and also competed at the Commonwealth Games. His brother Stuart is also a former Olympic badminton player.

He now works as a PE teacher at St Leo the Great Primary School.

References

External links 
 
 
 
 
 
 
 

1980 births
Living people
Australian male badminton players
Olympic badminton players of Australia
Badminton players at the 2004 Summer Olympics
Commonwealth Games competitors for Australia
Badminton players at the 2006 Commonwealth Games
21st-century Australian educators